Stella Atyang is a Ugandan politician and a District Woman representing Moroto in the Ugandan parliament. She was elected on April 26, 2017 on the ticket of National Resistance Movement to replace her niece, Annie Logiel the Woman MP representing Moroto before her death. Atyang was a lone candidate in the election after opposition parties declined to feature candidates fearing that the district would give her sympathy vote in honour of her deceased niece. She was declared elected unopposed.

References 

21st-century Ugandan women politicians
21st-century Ugandan politicians
National Resistance Movement politicians
People from Moroto District
Year of birth missing (living people)
Living people